Verdo Wilson "Ellie" Elmore (December 10, 1899 – August 5, 1969), was an American professional baseball outfielder, who played in Major League Baseball (MLB).

A curious fact is that all three of Elmore’s big league hits were doubles, which ties him with Earl Hersh and Dennis Powell for the most hits in an MLB career, where all of the player’s hits were two-baggers.

References

External links

1899 births
1969 deaths
People from Pickens County, Alabama
Major League Baseball outfielders
St. Louis Browns players
Muskegon Anglers players
Texarkana Twins players
Baseball players from Alabama